George Owen Williams (September 1879 – 27 July 1916) was an English semi-professional footballer who played in the Football League for West Bromwich Albion as a half back. He was capped by Wales at international level.

Personal life 
Williams served as a rifleman in the King's Royal Rifle Corps during the First World War and was killed during the Battle of the Somme on 27 July 1916. He is commemorated on the Thiepval Memorial.

Career statistics

See also
 List of Wales international footballers (alphabetical)

References

Welsh footballers
Wales international footballers
English Football League players
British Army personnel of World War I
1879 births
1916 deaths
Association football wing halves
Footballers from Birmingham, West Midlands
Wednesbury Old Athletic F.C. players
West Bromwich Albion F.C. players
Brierley Hill Alliance F.C. players
Kidderminster Harriers F.C. players
Wrexham A.F.C. players
Military personnel from Birmingham, West Midlands
Stafford Rangers F.C. players
Willenhall F.C. players
Walsall F.C. players
British military personnel killed in the Battle of the Somme
King's Royal Rifle Corps soldiers